The California Earthquake Authority is a privately funded, publicly managed organization that sells California earthquake insurance policies through participating insurance companies. Established in September 1996 by the California Legislature, it is based in Sacramento, California.

External links 
California Earthquake Authority website

Financial services companies established in 1996
Insurance companies of the United States